The 1977 Men's European Volleyball Championship was the tenth edition of the event, organized by Europe's governing volleyball body, the Confédération Européenne de Volleyball. It was hosted in Helsinki, Finland, Tampere, Turku and Oulu from September 25 to October 2, 1977, with the final round held in Helsinki.

Teams

Group A – Helsinki

Group B – Tampere

Preliminary round

Final round

Final ranking

References
 Results

Men's European Volleyball Championships
E
Volleyball Championship
V
International sports competitions in Helsinki
September 1977 sports events  in Europe
October 1977 sports events in Europe
1970s in Helsinki